The Esva is a river in northern Spain flowing through the Autonomous Community of Asturias.

Rivers of Spain
Rivers of Asturias